Kaj Ingemar Sundberg (1 April 1924 – 7 November 1993) was a Swedish diplomat.

Early life
Sundberg was born on 1 April 1924 in Färila, Gävleborg County, Sweden, the son of Karl-Filip Sundberg (1893–1955), a physician, and his wife Bertha Ebba Charlotta Ratsman (1896–1952). He had one brother, Bo Lennart (born 1929). He passed studentexamen at Lundsbergs boarding school in 1942 and received a Candidate of Law degree from Uppsala University in 1948.

Career
Following his studies, Sundberg was employed as an attaché at the Ministry for Foreign Affairs in Stockholm  in 1948. From 1949 to 1952 he served in Helsinki and from 1952 to 1954 he served in Bombay. He returned to the Ministry for Foreign Affairs in 1954 and became Second Secretary and then the First Secretary in 1961. Sundberg was appointed First Secretary in Washington, D.C. in 1962 and then Commercial Counsellor there in 1963. Sundberg was Deputy Director and Head of the UN Office at the Foreign Ministry in 1965, counsellor with the position as minister in the Swedish UN delegation in New York City in 1970, with the position of ambassador in 1974. Sundberg was ambassador to Teheran and Kabul 1978–1980, Helsinki 1980–1984, Brussels 1984-1989 and served at the UN delegation in New York City from 1989 to 1990.

Personal life
In 1966, Sundberg married Ardra Hall Johnston (born 12 August 1941 in Oil City, Pennsylvania, USA), the daughter of Drew Johnston and Nancy (née Spear). They had two sons, PhD Kaj Christian Filip Sundberg (born 11 October 1966 in Stockholm, Sweden), a physician and Drew Johnston Sundberg (born 9 August 1971 in New York City, New York, USA), a lawyer.

Death
Sundberg died on 7 November 1993 and was buried at Uppsala old cemetery.

Awards
Commander of the Order of the White Rose of Finland
Knight of the Order of Orange-Nassau

References

1924 births
1993 deaths
Ambassadors of Sweden to Iran
Ambassadors of Sweden to Afghanistan
Ambassadors of Sweden to Finland
Ambassadors of Sweden to Belgium
Uppsala University alumni
People from Ljusdal Municipality
Burials at Uppsala old cemetery
Swedish expatriates in the United States
Swedish expatriates in India